The Club de Monte-Carlo de l'Elite de la Philatélie was created in 1999 by sovereign decree of Prince Rainier III of Monaco to unite all of the philatelists who had convened in the Principality to exhibit major philatelic rarities. Membership of the club is restricted to institutions and one hundred prestigious collectors; the club showcases rare material on a bi-annual basis.

The club is headquartered at Monaco's Museum of Stamps and Coins. Rainier had been encouraged to start the club by the philatelist Alexander D. Kroo.

The president is Patrick Maselis.

References

External links
Official site

1999 establishments in Monaco
Philatelic organizations